Monaco competed at the 1952 Summer Olympics in Helsinki, Finland. Eight competitors, all men, took part in six events in two sports.

Sailing

Michel Aureglia
Victor de Sigaldi

Shooting

Six shooters represented Monaco in 1952.

25 m pistol
 Herman Schultz
 Charles Bergonzi

50 m pistol
 Herman Schultz

50 m rifle, three positions
 Roger Abel

50 m rifle, prone
 Pierre Marsan
 Roger Abel

Trap
 Georges Robini
 Marcel Rué

References

External links
Official Olympic Reports

Nations at the 1952 Summer Olympics
1952 Summer Olympics
Summer Olympics